The US Yachts US 30 is an American sailboat that was designed by Doug Peterson  and Daryl Watson and first built in 1979.

The design is an unauthorized development of Peterson's International Offshore Rule Half Ton class Chaser 29 racer, using the same hull design, but with no royalties paid. The US 30 molds were later sold to Pearson Yachts and developed into the Triton 30. Sailboatdata notes of US Yachts that, "the sailboat division of Bayliner took the practice of reusing the tooling from defunct builders to a whole new level."

Production
The design was built by US Yachts in the United States, from 1979 until 1983, but it is now out of production.

Design
The US Yachts US 30 is a recreational keelboat, built predominantly of fiberglass, with wood trim. It has a masthead sloop rig, a raked stem, a reverse transom, an internally mounted spade-type rudder controlled by a wheel and a fixed fin keel. It displaces  and carries  of ballast.

The design has sleeping accommodation for four people, with a double "V"-berth in the bow cabin and a drop-down dinette table and "U"-shaped settee that forms a double berth on the port side. The galley is located on the starboard side of the companionway ladder. The galley is "L"-shaped and is equipped with a two-burner stove, ice box and a sink. The head is located just aft of the bow cabin on the port side.

For sailing the design may be equipped with one of a number of jibs or genoas.

See also
List of sailing boat types

References

External links

Keelboats
1970s sailboat type designs
Sailing yachts
Sailboat type designs by Daryl Watson
Sailboat type designs by Doug Peterson
Sailboat types built by US Yachts